Ángela San Juan Cisneros (born 23 November 1983 in Madrid) is a Spanish swimmer who competed in the 2008 Summer Olympics.

Notes

References

External links
 
 
 
 

1983 births
Living people
Spanish female butterfly swimmers
Olympic swimmers of Spain
Swimmers at the 2008 Summer Olympics